Karólína Lea Vilhjálmsdóttir (born 8 August 2001) is an Icelandic footballer who plays as a forward for Bayern Munich and the Iceland women's national team.

Club career
In January 2021, Karólína signed with Bayern Munich. In June 2021 she won the Frauen-Bundesliga with the team. It was announced on 10 February 2022 that she had extended her contract at Bayern Munich until 2025.

International career
Karólína has been capped for the Iceland national team. She scored her first goal for Iceland in a 9–0 win over Latvia.

International goals

Personal life
Her maternal uncle, Gylfi Sigurðsson, is a professional footballer.

Honors

Club
Bayern Munich
Frauen-Bundesliga: 2020-21

References

External links

2001 births
Living people
Women's association football forwards
Karolina Lea Vilhjalmsdottir
Karolina Lea Vilhjalmsdottir
Karolina Lea Vilhjalmsdottir
Karolina Lea Vilhjalmsdottir
FC Bayern Munich (women) players
Úrvalsdeild kvenna (football) players
Frauen-Bundesliga players
Icelandic expatriate footballers
Expatriate women's footballers in Germany
Icelandic expatriate sportspeople in Germany
UEFA Women's Euro 2022 players